Gaddini is a surname. Notable people with the surname include:

Eugenio Gaddini (1916–1985), Italian physician and psychoanalyst
Rudy Gaddini (born 1934), American football coach

See also
Gardini